Svalbard may refer to:

Places
Svalbard, an archipelago in the Arctic, part of Norway. 
Svalbarðshreppur, an Icelandic municipality
Svalbarðsstrandarhreppur, an Icelandic municipality
Svalbarðseyri, an Icelandic village, municipal seat of Svalbarðsstrandarhreppur
Svalbard Global Seed Vault, a secure seedbank/gene bank located on the Norwegian island of Spitsbergen.
Svalbarð, a former name of Jan Mayen

Bands
Svalbard, an English hardcore punk band

Ships
NoCGV Svalbard, a Norwegian ship
HNoMS Svalbard (aka MS Togo under German flag), a Norwegian troop and DP transport ship

See also 
 Spitzbergen (disambiguation)